Conill is a Catalan-language surname, meaning rabbit, and may refer to:

Enrique Conill (1899–1970), a Cuban sailor
Joseph Sadoc Alemany y Conill (1814–1888), a Spanish Catholic clergyman

See also 
 Conill (Tàrrega), abandoned village in Tàrrega municipality, Catalonia
 Conill, village in Pujalt municipality, Catalonia
 Conejo, a Spanish-language variant
 Coelho, a Portuguese-language variant
 Coello (disambiguation), a Galician-language variant

Catalan-language surnames